Hans Luder may refer to:

Hans Luder, coach of FC Thun 1945-48
Hans Luder, father of the theologian Martin Luther